ZIPGUN (stylized in all-caps) are an American punk rock band from Seattle, Washington, United States, primarily active from 1991 to 1994. The original founding members were: guitarist Neil Rogers (The Derelicts, Glazed), singer Robb Clarke (Trids, RC5, The Burnz), bassist Mark Wooten (The Zanny Guys, Noble Firs) and drummer Dan Cunneen (Final Warning, The Obituaries, Seattle's Nightcaps,).

History 
ZIPGUN was formed and led by Neil Rogers, who had previously played guitar for Sub Pop recording artists The Derelicts.

In 1993, Mark Wooten quit the band and was replaced by bassist Andy Sheen. In late 1993 Sheen quit the band and was replaced by former Derelicts bassist Ian Dunsmore.

ZIPGUN broke up in 1994 and then reunited in 1996 for a single show at The Breakroom in Seattle with original bassist, Mark Wooten.

Background 
While ZIPGUN hailed from Seattle in the early 1990s, their music is not considered Grunge. ZIPGUN was one of a number of Seattle bands that avoided the prevailing musical trend, instead choosing to play punk rock. Other Seattle bands sharing the same philosophy during the era include: Gas Huffer, Supersuckers, The Gits, and Coffin Break.

The band was known for their "punk and roll" sound, which is characterized by its raw energy and power; delivered at slower tempos than typical American hardcore. ZIPGUN mined punk rock influences like The Stooges, Ramones, The Damned, and Buzzcocks. They also added elements of then-current bands like Screaming Trees and Mudhoney into their sound.

ZIPGUN was also known for their unpredictable stage performances and sometimes volatile interaction between singer Robb Clarke and guitarist Neil Rogers. (For instance, at their alcohol fueled debut show at Seattle's Crocodile Cafe, Rogers famously broke his Gibson SG guitar over Clarke's back.)

Legacy 
ZIPGUN released three singles and two full-length albums on Pacific Northwest independent record label, Empty Records and several other singles on various labels. The band toured extensively throughout the United States and Canada and appeared in the Doug Pray film Hype!, a documentary chronicling the 1990s Seattle Grunge music scene.

Currently, Rogers plays in Communist Eyes and The Derelicts (reformed in 2017). Clarke continues to play and record with the Seattle punk band The Burnz. Cunneen plays drums for Roxbury Saints and the Perkins Coie Band.

Discography 
 1991 Together Dumb/Cool in the Cell (single) Empty Records
 1991 Ten (one sided promo single) Empty Records
 1992 8 Track Player (CD/LP) Empty Records
 1992 The End/Nothing Cures (single) Musical Tragedies
 1993 Put Me Away (split single w/ Derelicts) Rekkids
 1993 Baltimore (CD/LP) Empty Records
 1994 I Can't Wait/Tight Black Pants (single) Thrill Jockey Records

External links
Official website
The Sara Monster Fanpage
Trouser Press review of 8 Track Player and Baltimore

Punk rock groups from Washington (state)
Musical groups from Seattle